Durand William Springer (August 9, 1866 – May 18, 1943) was an American football coach and accountant. He was a student-coach at Albion College in Albion, Michigan in 1884. After graduating, he took on a number of roles at the University of Michigan. Springer was named the manager of the football squad at Ann Arbor High School in 1898. He later worked as an auditor for the University of Michigan and was the first president of the American Association of Certified public accountants. Springer died on May 18, 1943, in Ann Arbor, Michigan.

Head coaching record

References

External links
 

1866 births
1943 deaths
American accountants
Albion Britons football coaches
Albion College alumni
University of Michigan staff
People from Durand, Wisconsin